Alchemilla baltica is a species of flowering plant belonging to the family Rosaceae.

Its native range is eastern central Europe to western Siberia.

References

baltica